Poladlı (also, Poladly and Polatly) is a village and municipality in the Gobustan Rayon of Azerbaijan. It has a population of 1,465. The municipality consists of the villages of Poladlı and Dağ Kolanlı.

References 

Populated places in Gobustan District